The 2015 Florida Tarpons season was the fourth season for the franchise and 1st as a member of X-League Indoor Football (X-League).

Schedule
Key:

Regular season
All start times are local to home team

Postseason

Standings

 z-Indicates best regular season record
 x-Indicates clinched playoff berth

y - clinched conference title
x - clinched playoff spot

Roster

References

Florida Tarpons
Florida Tarpons
Florida Tarpons